Anna Gębala-Duraj (born 25 May 1949) is a Polish cross-country skier. She competed at the 1968, 1972 and the 1976 Winter Olympics.

Cross-country skiing results

Olympic Games

References

External links
 

1949 births
Living people
Polish female cross-country skiers
Olympic cross-country skiers of Poland
Cross-country skiers at the 1968 Winter Olympics
Cross-country skiers at the 1972 Winter Olympics
Cross-country skiers at the 1976 Winter Olympics
People from Żywiec County